Javier Marcelo Sequeyra (born 23 July 1995 in Berisso) is an Argentine footballer currently playing for Plaza Colonia.

Career 

Sequeyra is born in Berisso. He made his debut in the 2012/13 season. He played two games that season.

References

External links
 
 

1995 births
Living people
Argentine footballers
Argentine expatriate footballers
Estudiantes de La Plata footballers
Club Atlético Villa San Carlos footballers
Club Plaza Colonia de Deportes players
Primera B Metropolitana players
Primera Nacional players
Uruguayan Primera División players
Uruguayan Segunda División players
Association football midfielders
Argentine expatriate sportspeople in Uruguay
Expatriate footballers in Uruguay
People from Berisso
Sportspeople from Buenos Aires Province